|}

The Prelude Handicap Hurdle is a National Hunt hurdle race in Great Britain which is open to horses aged three years or older. It is run at Market Rasen over a distance of about 2 miles and 110 yards (3,319 metres), and it is scheduled to take place each year in September.

The race was first run in 2007 and was awarded Listed status in 2011. It was downgraded to Class 2 status from the 2021 running.

Winners

See also
 Horse racing in Great Britain
 List of British National Hunt races

References
Racing Post:

National Hunt hurdle races
National Hunt races in Great Britain
Market Rasen Racecourse
Recurring sporting events established in 2007
2007 establishments in England